IFK Göteborg had a largely disappointing season, finishing in the bottom half of Allsvenskan, also letting go of highly rated Norwegian coach Arne Erlandsen, only for his successor Reine Almqvist to endure an even worse run of results, which saw him being let go after the season, too.

The club was also embroiled in controversy, as Peter Ijeh and Stefan Selaković were among with club director Mats Persson and an accountant trialled for tax evasion with regards to sign-on fees. In the end, Persson was sentenced to jail, while Selaković escaped that punishment, but was still convicted.

Squad

Goalkeepers
  Bengt Andersson
  Richard Richardsson

Defenders
  Alejandro Lago
  José Shaffer
  Adam Johansson
  Gustav Svensson
  Hjálmar Jónsson
  Dennis Jonsson
  Karl Svensson
  Mattias Bjärsmyr

Midfielders
  Thomas Olsson
  Magnus Kihlberg
  Martin Ulander
  Niclas Alexandersson
  Pontus Wernbloom
  Andrés Vasquez
  Samuel Wowoah

Attackers
  Stefan Selaković
  George Mourad
  Jonas Wallerstedt
  Ali Gerba
  Marcus Berg

Allsvenskan

Matches

 IFK Göteborg-Öster 0-0
 Elfsborg-IFK Göteborg 1-1
 1-0 Samuel Holmén 
 1-1 Karl Svensson 
 IFK Göteborg-Helsingborg 2-2
 0-1 Olivier Karekezi 
 0-2 McDonald Mariga 
 1-2 Thomas Olsson 
 2-2 Jonas Wallerstedt 
 Djurgården-IFK Göteborg 1-0
 1-0 Mattias Jonson 
 IFK Göteborg-Hammarby 1-2
 0-1 Björn Runström 
 0-2 Björn Runström 
 1-2 Karl Svensson 
 GAIS-IFK Göteborg 1-2
 0-1 Karl Svensson 
 0-2 Pontus Wernbloom 
 1-2 Jóhann Gudmundsson 
 IFK Göteborg-Häcken 3-0
 1-0 Dennis Jonsson 
 2-0 Stefan Selaković 
 3-0 Pontus Wernbloom 
 IFK Göteborg-Örgryte 2-1
 1-0 Magnus Kihlberg 
 1-1 Ola Toivonen 
 2-1 Stefan Selaković 
 IFK Göteborg-Malmö FF 1-0
 1-0 Thomas Olsson 
 Halmstad-IFK Göteborg 1-4
 0-1 George Mourad 
 1-1 Magnus Arvidsson 
 1-2 Hjálmar Jónsson 
 1-3 Pontus Wernbloom 
 1-4 George Mourad 
 Kalmar FF-IFK Göteborg 1-2
 0-1 Pontus Wernbloom 
 1-1 Viktor Elm 
 1-2 Pontus Wernbloom 
 IFK Göteborg-AIK 1-1
 1-0 Alejandro Lago 
 1-1 Daniel Mendes 
 IFK Göteborg-Gefle 3-1
 1-0 George Mourad 
 1-1 René Makondele 
 2-1 George Mourad 
 3-1 Alejandro Lago 
 Gefle-IFK Göteborg 1-0
 1-0 René Makondele 
 Öster-IFK Göteborg 1-1
 1-0 Ingmar Teever 
 1-1 Magnus Kihlberg 
 IFK Göteborg-Elfsborg 1-1
 0-1 Stefan Ishizaki 
 1-1 Gustaf Svensson 
 Häcken-IFK Göteborg 1-4
 0-1 Marcus Berg 
 0-2 Stefan Selaković 
 0-3 Jonas Wallerstedt 
 0-4 Jonas Wallerstedt 
 1-4 Daniel Larsson 
 Örgryte-IFK Göteborg 3-2
 1-0 Ola Toivonen 
 1-1 Marcus Berg 
 2-1 Aílton Almeida 
 3-1 Magnus Källander 
 3-2 Marcus Berg 
 Hammarby-IFK Göteborg 3-3
 0-1 Marcus Berg 
 1-1 Fredrik Stoor 
 2-1 Paulinho Guará 
 2-2 Thomas Olsson 
 3-2 Pablo Piñones-Arce 
 3-3 own goal 
 IFK Göteborg-GAIS 0-0
 Helsingborg-IFK Göteborg 3-2
 1-0 Fredrik Svanbäck 
 2-0 Babis Stefanidis 
 3-0 Henrik Larsson 
 3-1 Stefan Selaković 
 3-2 Pontus Wernbloom 
 IFK Göteborg-Djurgården 3-2
 1-0 Stefan Selaković 
 1-1 Mattias Jonson 
 1-2 Lance Davids 
 2-2 Jonas Wallerstedt 
 3-2 Thomas Olsson 
 IFK Göteborg-Kalmar FF 0-3
 0-1 Ari 
 0-2 César Santín 
 0-3 Viktor Elm 
 AIK-IFK Göteborg 4-0
 1-0 Mats Rubarth 
 2-0 Markus Jonsson 
 3-0 Daniel Tjernström 
 4-0 Wílton Figueiredo 
 Malmö FF-IFK Göteborg 2-1
 1-0 Júnior 
 2-0 Júnior 
 2-1 Samuel Wowoah 
 IFK Göteborg-Halmstad 0-0

Topscorers
  Pontus Wernbloom 6
  Jonas Wallerstedt 4
  Stefan Selaković 4
  George Mourad 4
  Thomas Olsson 3
  Karl Svensson 3
  Marcus Berg 3

Sources
   Playing Schedule - Allsvenskan 2006 (Swedish)
   FootballSquads - IFK Göteborg 2006

IFK Göteborg seasons
IFK Goteborg